The imperial election of 1612 was an imperial election held to select the emperor of the Holy Roman Empire.  It took place in Frankfurt on June 13.

Background 
The previous Holy Roman Emperor, Rudolf II, Holy Roman Emperor, died on January 20.  The prince-electors convened to replace him were:

 Johann Schweikhard von Kronberg, elector of Mainz
 Lothar von Metternich, elector of Trier
 Ferdinand of Bavaria, elector of Cologne
 Matthias, Holy Roman Emperor, king of Bohemia
 Frederick V of the Palatinate, elector of the Electoral Palatinate
 John George I, Elector of Saxony, elector of Saxony
 John Sigismund, Elector of Brandenburg, elector of Brandenburg

Elected 
Ferdinand promoted the election of his brother-in-law Maximilian I, Elector of Bavaria as emperor; however, Maximilian refused to accept the throne.  Instead, Rudolf's next surviving brother, Matthias, who had already taken power in Bohemia and Hungary, was elected.  He was crowned on June 26 at Frankfurt.

1612
1612 in the Holy Roman Empire
Non-partisan elections
17th-century elections in Europe
Matthias, Holy Roman Emperor